The 1962 South Dakota gubernatorial election was held on November 6, 1962.

Incumbent Republican Governor Archie M. Gubbrud defeated Democratic nominee Ralph Herseth with 56.10% of the vote.

Primary elections
Primary elections were held on June 5, 1962.

Democratic primary

Candidates
Ralph Herseth, former Governor

Results

Republican primary

Candidates
Archie M. Gubbrud, incumbent Governor

Results

General election

Candidates
Ralph Herseth, Democratic
Archie M. Gubbrud, Republican

Results

References

Bibliography
 
 

1962
South Dakota
Gubernatorial
November 1962 events in the United States